Safe is a 1995 psychological drama film written and directed by Todd Haynes and starring Julianne Moore. Set in 1987, it follows a suburban housewife in Los Angeles whose monotonous life is abruptly changed when she becomes sick with a mysterious illness caused by the environment around her.

The film topped the "best film of the 1990s" poll by The Village Voice, and was described by critics as "the scariest film of the year", "a mesmerizing horror movie", and "a work of feminist counter-cinema". 20 years after the film's release, Haynes said its themes—disease and immunity in a post-industrial landscape and how recovery is a burden often put on victims of illness—were even more relevant than they were when the film was released.

Plot
Carol White is a housewife living in an affluent suburb of Los Angeles. She passes her days with activities like gardening, aerobics, and seeing friends. Her marriage and family life appear stable but sterile, and her friends are polite but distant. Following the renovation of the family's home, Carol suddenly starts experiencing physical symptoms when she is around certain everyday chemicals: she coughs uncontrollably when breathing exhaust fumes from a nearby truck while driving, has breathing difficulties at a baby shower, and suffers from a nosebleed while getting a perm at a hair salon. As her symptoms worsen, the chemicals that are triggering them seem ubiquitous. Finally, she has a complete collapse while at her dry cleaners that is being fumigated with pesticides.

Doctors have no idea how to cure or help Carol. She attends some psychotherapy sessions, but her symptoms are not alleviated. She finds that she is very alone with her disease when her community behaves indifferently towards her. Accepting that she can no longer function in her current life, she leaves her home, possessions, and life behind. Without her husband, she moves to Wrenwood, an eerie new-age desert community for people with environmental illnesses. Wrenwood, which has cult-like aspects, is led by a man whose relentless motivational talks amount to "psychological fascism".

Even in a community of people with similar health issues, Carol seems to become more isolated. She moves into an igloo separated from the rest of the community. The film ends with Carol looking into the mirror saying "I love you" to herself.

Cast

 Julianne Moore as Carol White
 Peter Friedman as Peter Dunning
 Xander Berkeley as Greg White
 James LeGros as Chris
 Martha Velez as Fulvia
 Susan Norman as Linda
 Kate McGregor-Stewart as Claire
 Mary Carver as Nell 
 Steven Gilborn as Dr. Hubbard
 April Grace as Susan
 Lorna Scott as Marilyn
 Jodie Markell as Anita
 Brandon Cruz as Steve
 Dean Norris as Mover
 Jessica Harper as Joyce
 Beth Grant as Becky
 Rio Hackford as Lester

Production
Haynes first heard about "environmental illness" in 1991 on a TV magazine program that referred to it as "20th Century Disease". He and producer Vachon interviewed organizations that advocate for people who have environmental illness, such as Response Team for the Chemically Injured in Atascadero, California and The Chemical Connection in Wimberley, Texas, and in fact the monologue that Carol gives during her birthday party was based on transcripts of one of the interviews from Wimberley. Haynes also did research into New Age healing practices, and was especially interested in the work of Louise Hay, whose books became popular among gay men during the AIDS epidemic by telling them that self love would heal their illness. The fictional Wrenwood was inspired by a yoga retreat at Kripalu Center. He also got inspiration from Jeanne Dielman, 23 quai du Commerce, 1080 Bruxelles, 2001: A Space Odyssey and The Boy in the Plastic Bubble.

For the script, Haynes has said that the conceptual origin involved setting up barriers that prevent the audience from getting emotionally close to the character of Carol, which was a concept he explored again in Far from Heaven. He used political red herrings to make the audience trust certain characters at first, such as the leader of Wrenwood being a gay man. Since Haynes himself is gay, he thought the audience would expect the gay character to be trustworthy.

For the role of Carol, Haynes was initially interested in Susan Norman—who was later cast as Linda instead—but Julianne Moore's agent reached out to Vachon and insisted on an interview with her for the role. Moore knew exactly how to play the character of Carol as soon as she read the script: "I wanted the character to not put any weight on her larynx at all", so that's what she did in the audition that won her the part.

Cinematographer Alex Nepomniaschy suggested the look of Red Desert to Haynes after reading the script, and together they decided never to let the camera get very close to any of the characters as a way to keep emotional distance.

Potential investors wanted him to replicate the elements that had worked well in Haynes' previous film Poison, but since this film was different in so many ways, it took a long time to find the funding for it. The budget was around $1 million. Finally, filming began on January 1, 1994 in Los Angeles, and lasted 6 weeks.

For the film's premiere at Sundance, Haynes had removed the shot of Peter's mansion, but put it back in after hearing audience feedback because he wanted to emphasize Peter's hypocrisy.

Ultimately, the film presents no answer for her illness or predicament. Her condition is given no name in the film, but director Haynes confirmed that it is a depiction of multiple chemical sensitivity. He also said that Carol's isolation was both the answer and the problem for her.

Release
The film had its world premiere at the Sundance Film Festival on January 25, 1995. There were reports of people walking out of the theater because they didn't understand the movie. Vachon has said that critics at the premiere were mixed about the film, but by the end of the decade many had come around to it and placed the film among the decade's best.

Sony Pictures Classics acquired distribution rights to the film and released the film in a limited release on June 23, 1995.

Reception

Critical response
Safe received positive reviews from critics. Rotten Tomatoes reports 87% approval based on 60 reviews, with an average rating of 7.4/10 and the film holds a score of 76/100 on Metacritic. Janet Maslin, writing in The New York Times, lauds the first half of the film, but concludes that, as “brilliantly as it begins, Safe eventually succumbs to its own modern malady, as the film maker insists on a chilly ambiguity that breeds more detachment than interest”…. “Mr. Haynes makes fools of …[the film’s]  New Agers while possibly embracing some of their views.” Another problem, according to Maslin, is that “the shadow of AIDS implicitly hangs over …[Carol’s] decline, but it doesn't help bring Safe to a conclusion worthy of its inspired beginning”.

The ending of the film is highly ambiguous, and has created considerable debate among critics and audiences as to whether Carol has emancipated herself, or simply traded one form of suffocation for an equally constricting identity as a reclusive invalid. Julie Grossman argues in her article "The Trouble with Carol" that Haynes concludes the film as a challenge to traditional Hollywood film narratives of the heroine taking charge of her life, and that Haynes sets Carol up as the victim both of a male-dominated society, and also of an equally debilitating self-help culture that encourages patients to take sole responsibility for their illness and recovery.

Carol's illness, although unidentified, has been seen as an analogy for the 1980s AIDS crisis, a similarly uncomfortable and largely unspoken "threat" during the Reagan presidency.

Accolades
Safe received seven votes in the British Film Institute's 2012 Sight & Sound poll of the greatest films – with five votes from critics and two from directors – ranking it 323rd and 322nd, respectively. They Shoot Pictures, Don't They?, a website which gathers critics' polls, has also found Safe to be the 447th most acclaimed movie of all time.

The movie was widely critically acclaimed, giving Moore her first leading role in a feature film, and gave Haynes a measure of mainstream critical recognition.

Year-end lists
 1996 Independent Spirit Awards - Nominated for Best Director (Todd Haynes), Best Feature, Best Female Lead (Julianne Moore), and Best Screenplay (Todd Haynes)
 1995 Boston Society of Film Critics Awards - Best Cinematography - Alex Nepomniaschy
 1995 Seattle International Film Festival - American Independent Award - Todd Haynes
 1996 Rotterdam International Film Festival - FIPRESCI Prize Special Mention - Todd Haynes
 1999 Village Voice Film Poll - Winner VVFP - Award Best Film of the Decade

References

External links
 
 
 
 
 Safe on the Criterion Channel
 
 
 Multiple chemical sensitivity (MCS)

1995 films
1990s psychological drama films
American psychological drama films
American psychological horror films
British horror films
1990s English-language films
Environmental films
Films about diseases
American independent films
Films about psychiatry
Films set in the 1980s
Films directed by Todd Haynes
Films produced by Christine Vachon
Films set in 1987
Films set in the San Fernando Valley
Killer Films films
Films set in California
Sony Pictures Classics films
1995 independent films
1995 drama films
1990s American films
1990s British films